Pinye Malaibi (born 1962) is a Papua New Guinean weightlifter. He competed in the men's lightweight event at the 1988 Summer Olympics.

References

External links

1962 births
Living people
Papua New Guinean male weightlifters
Olympic weightlifters of Papua New Guinea
Weightlifters at the 1988 Summer Olympics
Place of birth missing (living people)